Pleurodonte guadeloupensis is a species of  tropical air-breathing land snail, a pulmonate gastropod mollusc in the family Pleurodontidae.

Subspecies
 Pleurodonte guadeloupensis dominicana Pilsbry & Cockerell, 1937 - This subspecies is endemic to the Caribbean island of Dominica.
 Pleurodonte guadeloupensis guadeloupensis (Pilsbry, 1889)
 Pleurodonte guadeloupensis martinensis Hovestadt & Neckheim, 2020
 Pleurodonte guadeloupensis roseolabrum (M. Smith, 1911)

Description
This is the smallest Pleurodonte species on Dominica. It has a velvety periostracum on the shell surface.

Distribution
The distribution of Pleurodonte guadeloupensis consists of:
 Dominica

Ecology
This species is widespread on Dominica and can be found in disturbed habitats and agricultural areas.

References
This article incorporates CC-BY-3.0 text from the reference 

I, p. 402 pp

External links
 Férussac, A.E.J.P.F. d'Audebard de. (1819-1832). Histoire naturelle générale et particulière des mollusques terrestres et fluviatiles tant des espèces que l'on trouve aujourd'hui vivantes, que des dépouilles fossiles de celles qui n'existent plus; classés d'après les caractères essentiels que présentent ces animaux et leurs coquilles. J.-B. Bailliere, Paris. Tome deuxième, première partie.
 Pilsbry, H. A. (1889-1890). Manual of conchology, structural and systematic, with illustrations of the species. Ser. 2, Pulmonata. Vol. 5: Helicidae, vol. 3. pp 1-216, pls 1-64. Philadelphia, published by the Conchological Section, Academy of Natural Sciences

Pleurodontidae